The Chinese Central People's Government (CPG) owns and operates numerous properties in Hong Kong. The CPG has three organs in Hong Kong- the Hong Kong Liaison Office, the Hong Kong Garrison of the PLA, and the Ministry of Foreign Affairs in Hong Kong. The Office for Safeguarding National Security was later added in July 2020 as another state agency.

Ministry of Commerce 
Though the Ministry of Commerce of the People's Republic of China is not one of the 3 organs of the CPG in Hong Kong, it purchased 8 properties in the 2015 financial year, with 3 in the Southern District and 5 in the Eastern District. The total unlevied stamp duty amounted to $3.6M HKD.

Ministry of Foreign Affairs 
The Ministry of Foreign Affairs' office is located at 42 Kennedy Road. It also operates the Visa Division of the Consular Department of the Commissioner's Office at 3/F, China Resources Building, 26 Harbor Road for those who hold diplomatic passports or are entering the People's Republic of China for diplomatic purposes.

Next to the 42 Kennedy Road office and connected via foot bridge is the 25 floor residential tower of the Ministry of Foreign Affairs, located at 6 Borrett Road, which includes a tennis court. At 6A Borrett Road, in a separate and newly-constructed building, is the official residence of the Commissioner.

Border Defense Corps 
The Border Defense Corps is not one of the 3 organs of the CPG in Hong Kong. In 2018, it was discovered that the Border Defense Corps (then part of the People's Armed Police, now part of the Ministry of Public Security) had diverted a river in 2013 in New Territories, near Sha Tau Kok, changing the border and occupying 21,000 sq ft of space that belongs to four Hong Kong landowners. None of the landowners were informed by either the mainland or Hong Kong governments, with the Hong Kong government claiming that they had no knowledge of the river diversion. Instead of rectifying the issue, the Hong Kong Lands Department told one of the landowners that he should sue the People's Liberation Army instead.

Office for Safeguarding National Security 
The Office for Safeguarding National Security is located in the former Metropark Hotel Causeway Bay building. It was previously owned by China Travel Service, another branch of the mainland Chinese government. The building serves as both the office and living quarters for its employees.

In April 2021, the Office announced that it was taking over the Island Pacific Hotel in Sai Ying Pun as an additional work site. Also, it announced a third site via constructing its permanent headquarters at Tai Kok Tsui.

In November 2022, the Office bought a 7,171 sqft 5-bedroom mansion in Beacon Hill for HK$508 million. SCMP reported that the unit is Villa 1 of Mont Rouge.

PLA Hong Kong Garrison 
Upon the Handover of Hong Kong, 18 sites of the British forces were transferred to the People's Liberation Army, and one (the Central Military Dock) was added in to make a total of 19 sites, as defined in the Military Installations Closed Areas Order. In 2014, citing recent media reports, legislator Kenneth Chan asked the government about a suspected 20th site, a radar installation at Tai Mo Shan; Garrison Law requires the public to be informed about the opening of new sites. The government stated that the relevant area was not one of the 19 military sites, and pointed to the legal obligation of the government to support the Hong Kong Garrison while saying that details on Hong Kong operations could generally not be given due to military secrecy considerations. In January 2021, in response to reports of Communist Party of China slogans on the radome surfacing, as well as photos of a PLA vehicle and a soldier in PLA uniform, the Hong Kong government for the first time spoke of the building as housing telecommunication devices for defence purposes.

In December 2017, a Reuters article reported that many of the military sites were underused. Some lawmakers and activists suggested that the land be returned to the city to build housing.

Liaison Office and Newman Investment 
Though the Liaison Office is headquartered at The Westpoint, the Liaison Office has purchased other offices and a significant number of residential apartments in Hong Kong. In an unusual setup, Newman Investment Co Ltd, a "Subsidiary company of a CPG’s organ in Hong Kong," has been identified as a subsidiary of the Liaison Office. Purchases of property have been done both through the Liaison Office and secretly through Newman Investment. Also unusual is the fact that the Liaison Office has bought housing as a benefit to its employees.

Although Newman Investment is a private company and is not registered as an incorporated public officer, which would qualify it from not paying stamp duties under section 41(1) of the Stamp Duty Ordinance, Hong Kong Chief Executives have, under section 52(1) of the SDO, have allowed Newman Investment to not pay stamp duties. This has allowed Newman Investment to escape stamp duties of several hundred million HKD within the last several years alone. This means that normal Hong Kong citizens who pay stamp duties and taxes are not only subsidizing the Liaison office, but also have less housing inventory to purchase on the market.

For the past several years, several District Council members have asked the government for a detailed breakdown of property owned by the Liaison Office and Newman Investment, as well as the reasoning for Newman Investment, a private company, to escape paying stamp duties. The government has consistently only given brief summarized results, hiding details on the transactions, despite taxpayer money subsidizing the purchases. For example, in March 2019, Kenneth Leung, a Legislative Council member, asked for details from the Secretary for Financial Services and the Treasury, James Lau, only to be given summarized results.

Newman Investment Company Information 
Companies in Hong Kong are required to fill out a NAR1 Annual Return form every year, and submit it to the Companies Registry. For a small fee, anybody can perform a lookup on any registered company. In Newman Investment's February 2020 Annual Return (NAR1), it lists the Company Secretary as Xiao Xiaosan, and the four remaining directors as Chen Zhibin, Li Xuhong, Sun Zhongxin, and Chen Dunzhou. According to SCMP, directors of Newman have been officials from the Liaison Office's Administration and Finance Department.

Residential Properties 
In April 2020, Demosisto distributed a press release and map, showing the extent of property purchases by the Liaison Office and Newman Investment. In the press release, it was shown that as of the end of February 2019, 722 residential units had been purchased, with 156 purchased by the Liaison Office, and the remaining 566 purchased through Newman Investment. Of the 566 properties purchased by Newman, 542 were found with an exact address, and the remaining 24 have no exact address that could be found by Demosisto.

Office Properties 
The Liaison Office and Newman own 12 offices around Hong Kong; many are used by pro-Beijing organizations, such as the DAB.

Retail Properties 
The Liaison Office and Newman also own 8 retail properties in Hong Kong.

Vehicle Parking Spaces 
The Liaison Office and Newman own 15 parking spaces, 3 of which were purchased by Newman but whose exact address could not be found by Demosisto.

References

Politics of Hong Kong